Laminafroneta is a genus of African dwarf spiders that was first described by P. Merrett in 2004.  it contains only three species, found in Cameroon, Middle Africa, Ethiopia, Kenya, Rwanda, and Tanzania: L. bidentata, L. brevistyla, and L. locketi.

See also
 List of Linyphiidae species (I–P)

References

Araneomorphae genera
Linyphiidae
Spiders of Africa